Jan Vokoun (born 2 August 1887, date of death unknown) was a Czech cyclist. He competed for Bohemia in two events at the 1912 Summer Olympics.

References

External links
 

1887 births
Year of death missing
Czech male cyclists
Olympic cyclists of Bohemia
Cyclists at the 1912 Summer Olympics
Sportspeople from Prague
Sportspeople from the Austro-Hungarian Empire